Jaroslav Obšut (born March 9, 1976) is a Slovak former ice hockey player. He last played for HC Bratislava of the Slovak 1.Liga. Obsut is of German and Slovak descent.

Playing career
Obšut was drafted to the National Hockey League (NHL) in 1995 by the Winnipeg Jets in the eighth round, 188th overall. Obšut played seven games in the NHL, four for the St. Louis Blues and three for the Colorado Avalanche. After playing with Luleå in the Swedish Elitserien for five seasons, Jaroslav signed a two-year contract with HC Spartak Moscow of the Kontinental Hockey League on May 27, 2009. During his second year with Spartak, Obsut was released to play with league rival, HK Atlant, on November 26, 2010.

On May 27, 2011, Obsut signed a one-year contract with fellow KHL team, Dynamo Minsk, for the 2011–12 season.

Career statistics

Regular season and playoffs

International

References

External links

 

1976 births
Living people
Augusta Lynx players
Colorado Avalanche players
Edmonton Ice players
Atlant Moscow Oblast players
HC Dinamo Minsk players
HC Donbass players
HK Dukla Trenčín players
HC Spartak Moscow players
Hershey Bears players
Ice hockey players at the 2002 Winter Olympics
Luleå HF players
Manitoba Moose players
Manitoba Moose (IHL) players
Medicine Hat Tigers players
Battlefords North Stars players
Olympic ice hockey players of Slovakia
Sportspeople from Prešov
Peoria Rivermen (ECHL) players
Raleigh IceCaps players
St. Louis Blues players
Slovak ice hockey defencemen
Swift Current Broncos players
Syracuse Crunch players
Toledo Storm players
Winnipeg Jets (1979–1996) draft picks
Worcester IceCats players
Slovak people of German descent
Slovak expatriate sportspeople in Ukraine
Slovak expatriate ice hockey players in the United States
Slovak expatriate ice hockey players in Canada
Slovak expatriate sportspeople in Belarus
Slovak expatriate ice hockey players in Sweden
Slovak expatriate ice hockey players in Russia
Slovak expatriate sportspeople in Romania
Expatriate ice hockey players in Romania
Expatriate ice hockey players in Belarus
Expatriate ice hockey players in Ukraine